Polovina may refer to:

Places
Polovina, Albania (sq), village in Perondi Municipality, Kuçovë District, Berat County, Albania
Polovina, Estonia, village in Meremäe Parish, Võru County, Estonia
Polovina, Vologda Oblast, Russia

People
Himzo Polovina (1927–1986), Bosnian singer and songwriter